Viviennea moma is a moth in the family Erebidae first described by William Schaus in 1905. It is found in Guyana, French Guiana, Brazil, Venezuela, Ecuador, Peru and Bolivia.

References

Phaegopterina
Moths described in 1905